Otto Schmidt (1891–1956) was a Soviet scientist, mathematician, astronomer, geophysicist, statesman, academician, and hero of the USSR.

Otto Schmidt may also refer to:

 Otto Schmidt (aviator) (1885–1944), German World War I flying ace
 Otto Schmidt (CDU) (1902–1984), German politician
 Otto Schmidt (tennis), Hungarian tennis player
 Otto Diller Schmidt (1884–1963), American Medal of Honor recipient
 Joe Schmidt (ice hockey)  (1926–2000), known as Otto, Canadian professional ice hockey player